Hemesh Kharkwal is an Indian politician from Uttarakhand. He is a member of the Indian National Congress.

In 2012, he was elected from Champawat district's Champawat assembly constituency of Uttarakhand. He was also the MLA of Uttarakhand from 2013 to 2017. He's one of the leaders from Uttarakhand who had won many times in Champawat Uttarakhand. He's also participating in the elections of 2022 against BJP MLA Kailash Gahtori. He has also held office for three years continuing to win and also lose.

References

Living people
People from Champawat district
Year of birth missing (living people)
Uttarakhand politicians